Pensions Act may refer to 

 Pensions Act 1995, an Act of the Parliament of the United Kingdom
 Pensions Act 2004, an Act of the Parliament of the United Kingdom
 Pensions Act 2007, an Act of the Parliament of the United Kingdom
 Pensions Act 2008, an Act of the Parliament of the United Kingdom